Kalhatti Falls or Kalhattigiri Falls is a waterfall on the headwaters of the river , located at Kallathigiri, Tarikere Taluk in Chikmagalur district of  Karnataka.

Location
Kalhatti Falls is located 45 minutes from Tarikere (Tarikere Taluk in Chikmagalur District). It belongs Tarikere taluk of chikkamagalur district.

See also
List of waterfalls in India

External links
 Kalhatti Falls on Karnataka.com
World Waterfall Database Entry

Waterfalls of Karnataka
Geography of Chikkamagaluru district
Tourist attractions in Chikkamagaluru district